The 2001–02 Toto Cup Artzit was the 3rd time the cup was being contested as a competition for the third tier in the Israeli football league system.

The competition was won by Hapoel Ashkelon, who had beaten Ironi Kiryat Shmona 1–0 in the final. Hapoel Ashkelon had previously won the Toto Cup Artzit in 1985, however, at the time Liga Artzit was the second tier of the football league system.

Group stage

Group A

Group B

Group C

Semifinals
{| class="wikitable" style="text-align: center"
|-
!Home Team
!Score
!Away Team
|-

Final

See also
 Toto Cup
 2001–02 Liga Artzit

References

External links
 Israel Cup 2001/02 RSSSF 

Toto Cup Artzit
Toto Cup Artzit
Israel Toto Cup Artzit